Dalston is a large village and civil parish within the Carlisle district of Cumbria, historically part of Cumberland.

The village is on the River Caldew, just to the north of where the Roe Beck joins the river.

Historic buildings

Rose Castle, home of the Bishop of Carlisle for many centuries until 2009, is within the parish of Dalston,  from the heart of the village. The Architects Anthony Salvin and Thomas Rickman were responsible for the alterations which took place in the 19th Century.

Dalston Hall is a grade II* listed fortified house which is now a country house hotel.
 
Dalston has two churches;  St Michael's + All Angels Church.

Governance
There is a county electoral division of Dalston, stretching north towards Carlisle, with a total population at the 2011 United Kingdom census of 6,051.

Education
There are two schools in Dalston, St. Michaels Primary School and Caldew Secondary School.

Economy
There is a Nestlé factory producing powdered milk, a BP fuel depot and the Barras Lane trading estate.

Notable people
Sir James Graham, 2nd Baronet (1792–1861) was educated at Dalston.
Georgiana Harcourt (1807–1886), translator, was born at Dalston while her father Edward Venables-Vernon-Harcourt was Bishop of Carlisle.
William Paley (1743–1805), was Vicar of Dalston in the 1780s.
Edward Rainbowe (1608–1684) lived here while Bishop of Carlisle.
George Robinson (1737–1801), London publisher, was born here.
Sarah Story, DJ
Musgrave Watson (1804–1847), sculptor, was born here.

See also

Listed buildings in Dalston, Cumbria
Unthank, Dalston

References

External links

Cumbria County History Trust: Dalston (nb: provisional research only – see Talk page)
Dalston Community Website

 
Villages in Cumbria
Civil parishes in Cumbria
City of Carlisle